Bruno Miguel Pinheiro Simões (born 3 September 1995)  is a Portuguese footballer  who plays for Leça, as a midfielder.

Football career
On 20 August 2014, Simões made his professional debut with Trofense in a 2014–15 Taça da Liga match against Aves.

References

External links

Stats and profile at LPFP 

1995 births
Living people
People from Vila Nova de Famalicão
Portuguese footballers
Association football midfielders
C.D. Trofense players
S.C. Salgueiros players
Lusitano FCV players
Sport Benfica e Castelo Branco players
S.C.U. Torreense players
Leça F.C. players
F.C. Pedras Rubras players
Sportspeople from Braga District